Nanna Egedius (14 May 1913 – 21 April 1986) was a Norwegian figure skater. 

She competed at the 1931 World Figure Skating Championships, where she placed seventh. She also competed at the 1933, 1934 and 1935 World Figure Skating Championships, and she participated at the 1936 Winter Olympics. Egedius won the Norwegian Figure Skating Championships in 1932, 1933, 1934, 1935 and  1936.

Results

References

External links

1913 births
1986 deaths
Norwegian female single skaters
Olympic figure skaters of Norway
Figure skaters at the 1936 Winter Olympics
Sportspeople from Oslo
20th-century Norwegian women